Theophanis "Fanis" Koumpouras (born December 8, 1983) is a Greek professional basketball player. He is 6 ft 1  in (1.87 m) in height, and he plays at the point guard position.

Professional career
Koumpouras began his career playing with the Panionios youth teams. He began his pro career in 2001, with Chalkida. In 2004, he moved to Apollon Patras. In 2007, he joined Olympia Larissa, where he had a great year during the 2007–08 season. In 2008, he signed with Maroussi.

National team career
With the Greek junior national teams, Koumpouras played at the 1999 FIBA Europe Under-16 Championship, where he won a silver medal, at the 2000 FIBA Europe Under-18 Championship, where he won a bronze medal, and at the 2002 FIBA Europe Under-20 Championship, where he won a gold medal.

With the Greek under-26 national team, he won the silver medal at both the 2005 Mediterranean Games and the 2009 Mediterranean Games.

External links
Euroleague.net Profile
FIBA Archive Profile
FIBA Europe Profile
Eurobasket.com Profile
Greek League Profile 
Hellenic Federation Profile 

1983 births
Living people
AGEH Gymnastikos B.C. players
Aiolos Astakou B.C. players
Apollon Patras B.C. players
Aris B.C. players
Basketball players from Athens
Competitors at the 2005 Mediterranean Games
Competitors at the 2009 Mediterranean Games
Greek men's basketball players
Ikaros B.C. players
Kolossos Rodou B.C. players
Maroussi B.C. players
Mediterranean Games medalists in basketball
Mediterranean Games silver medalists for Greece
Oiakas Nafpliou B.C. players
Olympia Larissa B.C. players
Point guards
Promitheas Patras B.C. players
Rethymno B.C. players